Luke Brennan (born 19 October 2001) is an English professional footballer who last played as a midfielder for EFL Championship side Wigan Athletic.

Career
A youth product of Blackburn Rovers Brennan joined at under-7s leve, In July 2020 he signed his 1st professional contract. Brennan made his professional debut coming off the bench on in the 81st minute for Blackburn Rovers in a 1–0 defeat Nottingham Forest on 17 October 2020.

In November 2020, Brennan joined AFC Fylde on loan until the end of the season. In January 2021, Brennan was recalled by Rovers.

On 20 May 2022, Blackburn announced Brennan would be departing the club upon the expiration of his contract on 30 June, with the club opting against offering the player a new deal.

On 25 June 2022, Wigan announced Brennan would join their u23s.

References

External links
 
 Rovers Profile

2001 births
Living people
English footballers
Association football midfielders
Blackburn Rovers F.C. players
AFC Fylde players
English Football League players
National League (English football) players